Kuiper  is a small lunar impact crater in a relatively featureless part of the Mare Cognitum. It is a circular, cup-shaped feature with only some minor wear. It was named after Dutch-American astronomer Gerard Kuiper in 1976. Kuiper was the Project Scientist for the Ranger program. This crater was previously identified as Bonpland E. The lava-flooded crater Bonpland lies to the east at the edge of the Mare Cognitum.

To the east-southeast of Kuiper crater is the crash landing site of the Ranger 7 probe, the first American spacecraft to photograph the Moon.

References

External links

Kuiper at The Moon Wiki
 LTO-6D2 Kuiper — L&PI topographic map
 

Impact craters on the Moon
Gerard Kuiper